William Upton (14 June 1804 – 1867) was an English cricketer. Upton's batting style is unknown. He was born at Cotgrave, Nottinghamshire.

Upton made two first-class appearances for Nottingham Cricket Club, with both appearances coming against Sheffield Cricket Club at Darnall New Ground in 1827 and 1828. He scored at total of 17 runs in his two matches at an average of 5.66, with a high score of 9 not out.

He died at the village of his birth at some point in 1867.

References

External links
William Upton at ESPNcricinfo
William Upton at CricketArchive

1804 births
1867 deaths
People from Cotgrave
Cricketers from Nottinghamshire
English cricketers
Nottingham Cricket Club cricketers